Philonesia pitcairnensis is a species of air-breathing land snail or semislug, a terrestrial pulmonate gastropod mollusk in the family Helicarionidae. This species is endemic to Pitcairn.

References

P
Fauna of the Pitcairn Islands
Molluscs of Oceania
Vulnerable fauna of Oceania
Gastropods described in 1838
Taxonomy articles created by Polbot